Emu Creek is a rural locality in the Toowoomba Region, Queensland, Australia.

History 
In 1877,  were resumed from the Eskdale pastoral run and offered for selection on 24 April 1877.

Emu Creek State School opened on 31 May 1875. Despite the name, the school is in East Greenmount.

In 1879 the post office called Emu Creek Siding was renamed Greenmount, and the post office formerly called Greenmount was renamed Emu Creek.

Notable residents 
Australian author Arthur Hoey Davis, who wrote under the pen name 'Steele Rudd', spent much of his childhood on his family's small block at Emu Creek near East Greenmount in the Cambooya district. He is best known for creating the Australian characters Dad 'n' Dave.

References 

Toowoomba Region
Localities in Queensland